Senan Louis O'Donnell, OSA (born  24 February 1927) on Scattery Island, County Clare, Ireland is a retired Catholic Bishop of Maiduguri, Nigeria.

Orders 

He was ordained a priest of the Order of Saint Augustine on 17 July 1955 and subsequently consecrated as Bishop of Maiduguri, Nigeria on 28 November 1993 by Bishop Patrick Francis Sheehan and retired from that role on 28 February 2003.

References

1927 births
Living people
20th-century Roman Catholic bishops in Nigeria
Irish expatriate Catholic bishops
Irish expatriates in Nigeria
Augustinian bishops
21st-century Roman Catholic bishops in Nigeria
Roman Catholic bishops of Maiduguri